Fox Hunt is Australian thriller author James Phelan's first novel, released in 2006.

Plot summary 
Lachlan Fox is a former Royal Australian Navy Special Forces Clearance Diver who is living on Christmas Island after being Dishonorably discharged after a mission gone wrong in East Timor. When Fox and best friend, former Navy pilot Alister Gammaldi, discover an unusual capsule whilst diving off Christmas Island, little do they know they have discovered something that could result in the outbreak of World War III.

Sequels 
 Patriot Act
 Blood Oil
 Liquid Gold
 Red Ice

References 

2006 Australian novels
Novels by James Clancy Phelan
Techno-thriller novels

Iran in fiction
Novels set in Australia
Hachette (publisher) books